Raymond Francis Krouse (March 21, 1927 – April 9, 1966) was an American football defensive lineman in the National Football League (NFL) for the New York Giants (1951–1955), the Detroit Lions (1956–1957), Baltimore Colts (1958–1959) and Washington Redskins (1960). He played college football for the University of Maryland.

Early years
Krouse attended Western High School,  before moving on to the University of Maryland (Δ Φ [Delta Phi]).

During the World War II era, he served in the United States Navy reserves and was discharged as a Seaman 2nd Class.

In 1992, he was posthumously inducted into the University of Maryland Athletic Hall of Fame. The Ray Krouse Award is given to the team's most valuable player.

Professional career

New York Giants
Krouse was selected by the New York Giants in the second round (25th overall) of the 1951 NFL Draft. The 1951 Giants defense he was part of, allowed the fewest total yards and rushing yards in the NFL for that season. 1952 was said to be his best professional year. On April 26, 1956, he was traded to the Detroit Lions in exchange for defensive tackle Dick Modzelewski.

Detroit Lions
He helped the Detroit Lions win the 1957 NFL Championship. On July 17, 1958, he was traded to the Baltimore Colts in exchange for a third round draft choice (#36-Ron Luciano).

Baltimore Colts
Krouse was a part of the 1958 NFL Championship Game against the New York Giants, famously known as "The Greatest Game Ever Played". The 1958 Colts defense he was part of, allowed the fewest rushing yards in the NFL for that season.  He contributed to the Colts winning back to back NFL titles in 1958 and 1959 against his old team, the Giants.

Dallas Cowboys
He was selected by the Dallas Cowboys in the 1960 NFL Expansion Draft. On June 23, he was traded to the Washington Redskins in exchange for center Frank Kuchta.

Washington Redskins
Krouse played one season for the Washington Redskins.

Personal life
The Washington Post on April 10, 1966, said, "Raymond Francis Krouse, one of the finest athletes ever to come out of Washington, died yesterday at Georgetown University Hospital of a liver ailment." He left behind a wife, Majorie; four daughters (Karen, 14, Kimberly, 8, Carolyn, 5, and Kathy, 4 [ages at the time of his burial]); his mother, Mrs. Josephine Krouse; a sister, Mrs. Margaret Haney; and a brother, William (Sully) Krouse. He was buried on April 13, 1966, at Arlington National Cemetery nearby his son, David Edward, who died in 1963, after living two days.

References

1927 births
1966 deaths
Players of American football from Washington, D.C.
American football defensive linemen
Maryland Terrapins football players
New York Giants players
Detroit Lions players
Baltimore Colts players
Washington Redskins players
Eastern Conference Pro Bowl players
Burials at Arlington National Cemetery
United States Navy personnel of World War II
United States Navy reservists
United States Navy sailors